Cychrus kalabi is a species of ground beetle in the subfamily of Carabinae. It was described by Deuve in 1991.

References

kalabi
Beetles described in 1991